Arnaldo Pomodoro (born 23 June 1926) is an Italian sculptor. He was born in Morciano, Romagna, and lives and works in Milan. His brother, Giò Pomodoro (1930–2002) was also a sculptor.

Pomodoro designed a controversial fiberglass crucifix for the Cathedral of St. John the Evangelist in Milwaukee, Wisconsin. The piece is topped with a fourteen-foot diameter crown of thorns which hovers over the figure of Christ.

Some of Pomodoro's Sphere Within Sphere (Sfera con Sfera) can be seen in the Vatican Museums, Trinity College, Dublin, the United Nations Headquarters and Mt. Sinai Hospital in New York, the Hirshhorn Museum and Sculpture Garden in Washington, D.C., Christian Theological Seminary in Indianapolis, the de Young Museum in San Francisco, Tehran Museum of Contemporary Art, American Republic Insurance Company in Des Moines, Iowa, the Columbus Museum of Art in Columbus, Ohio, the University of California, Berkeley, the Virginia Museum of Fine Arts in Richmond, Virginia, and the Tel Aviv University, Israel.

Early life 
Arnaldo Pomodoro was born on 23 June 1926 in Morciano di Romagna, Montefeltro area. He received his diploma from the Technical Institute for Surveyors in Rimini, and then worked at the Public Works Office in Pesaro. He developed an interest in art and scenography, and attended the Art Institute in Pesaro.

1950s–60s 
In 1953, Pomodoro attended an exhibition of Picasso which was held in Milan at the Palazzo Reale. This exhibition made a strong impression on him, and a year after he moved to Milan where he joined the artistic community and became friends with Lucio Fontana, Dangelo, Sanesi, Baj, and others. He took part in the 10th Triennale in Milan, and together with his brother Gio' he also participated in the Venice Biennale.

In 1959, Arnaldo Pomodoro received a grant to study American art, and traveled to the United States for the first time. He describes his visit to MoMa and seeing Brancusi's sculptures as a strong inspiration for his work. In San Francisco, he met Mark Rothko who was teaching at the California School of Fine Arts. In New York Pomodoro met Costantino Nivola and Enrico Donati who introduced him to such artists as Franz Kline, Jasper Johns, Andy Warhol and others. He also met sculptors David Smith and Louise Nevelson, and organized an exhibition New Work from Italy, dedicated to Italian artists.

Later in 1960s, he developed a collaboration with the Marlborough Gallery in New York. In 1963, Pomodoro received the International Prize for Sculpture at the VII São Paulo Biennale and also the National Prize for Sculpture at the XXXII Venice Biennale in 1964. In 1966, he became an artist in residence at Stanford University, and then at UC Berkeley and Mills College. The following year he created the Sfera grande for the Italian Pavilion at the Montreal Expo. This sculpture is now located in front of the Farnesina Palace in Rome. That year Pomodoro won the International Prize for Sculpture from the Carnegie Institute in Pittsburgh.

1970s–80s 

In 1972, Arnaldo Pomodoro returned to set design, and worked on the play Das Käthchen von Heilbronn by Heinrich von Kleist, which was staged in Zurich. In 1984, he had a large retrospective exhibition at the Forte di Belvedere in Florence. In 1988, Pomodoro participated in the Venice Biennale as well as the international exhibition of sculpture at the World Expo in Brisbane. His work Forme del Mito (Forms of Myth) which was displayed at the Expo, was later purchased by Brisbane City Council for the City of Brisbane.

1990s–present 

In 1990, Arnaldo Pomodoro received the Praemium Imperiale for Sculpture from the Japan Art Association.

His work Sfera con Sfera was installed in the Cortile della Pigna of the Vatican Museums. In 1992, he was awarded an honorary degree in Literature by Trinity College in Dublin. The following year he was nominated the honorary member of the Brera Art Academy in Milan.

In 1995, the Fondazione Arnaldo Pomodoro was created as a cultural and exhibition center dedicated to contemporary art. Originally conceived as a centre to document and archive the work of the artist, it opened an exhibition space in 2005, hosting exhibitions of prominent artists such as Jannis Kounellis, Lucio Fontana and Robert Rauschenberg. The director of Fondazione Arnaldo Pomodoro is Flaminio Gualdoni.

In 1996, Arnaldo Pomodoro was awarded the Knight of the Great Cross of the Italian Republic (Cavaliere di gran croce dell'Ordine al merito della Repubblica italiana). His sculpture Sfera con Sfera was installed in front of the United Nations building in New York City.

In 2014–15, Pomodoro finished one of his fundamental works – the Pietrarubbia Group, which was started in 1975. He then explained the idea behind this project:

Quotes 
On Form and Movement:

Set design for theatre and opera
 Semiramide by Gioacchino Rossini (1982), Teatro dell'Opera of Rome
 Orestea di Gibellina by Emilio Isgrò, on a text by Eschilo (1983–1985)
 Didone by Christopher Marlowe (1986)
 Alceste by Christoph Willibald Gluck (1987), Teatro dell'Opera of Genoa – stage and costumes
 Oedipus rex by Igor Stravinsky (1988), Siena
 La Passione di Cleopatra by Ahmad Shawqi, an Egyptian poet (1989)
 I Paraventi by Jean Genet (1990), Teatro Comunale of Bologna – stage and costumes
 Nella solitudine dei campi di cotone by Bernard-Marie Koltès (1992)
 Più grandiose dimore by Eugene O'Neill (1993)
 Oreste di Vittorio Alfieri (1993)
 Stabat Mater, La passione secondo Giovanni and Vespro della Beata Vergine by Antonio Tarantino (1994–1995)
 Moonlight by Harold Pinter (1995)
 Drammi Marini by Eugene O'Neill (1996)
 Antigone by Jean Anouilh (1996)
 Tempesta (The Tempest) by William Shakespeare (1998) – stage and costumes
 Un ballo in maschera by Giuseppe Verdi (2005), Opernhaus of Lipsia – stage and costumes
 Teneke by Fabio Vacchi (2007), Teatro alla Scala of Milan – stage and costumes

Honors and awards

 International Prize for Sculpture, VII São Paulo Biennale, 1963.
 National Prize for Sculpture, XXXII Venice Biennale, 1964.
 International Prize for Sculpture, Carnegie Institute, 1967. 
 Praemium Imperiale for Sculpture, Japan Art Association, 1990.
 Honorary degree in Literature, Trinity College, 1992. 
 The Knight of the Great Cross of the Italian Republic, 1996. 
 International Sculpture Center's Lifetime Achievement in Contemporary Sculpture Award, 2008.

Gallery

Footnotes

References
 Radford, Georgia and Warren Radford, Sculpture in the Sun, Hawaii's Art for Open Spaces, University of Hawaii Press, 1978, 95.

External links

 Arnaldo Pomodoro biography on the Guggenheim Museum Website
 Fondazione Arnaldo Pomodoro
 Museum of Outdoor Arts MOA>art piece full details
 Arnaldo Pomodoro's major creations 

20th-century Italian sculptors
20th-century Italian male artists
Italian male sculptors
21st-century Italian sculptors
Italian contemporary artists
Living people
1926 births
21st-century Italian male artists